Richard Weiss (born 1946 in Everett, Washington) is an American glass artist.

He is part of the American Studio Glass Movement. He earned his Bachelor of Arts in psychology from Yale University, New Haven, Connecticut. He is a teacher at Pilchuck Glass School and is primarily known for his large installations such as the work at The Seattle/Tacoma Airport and his collaborations with Walter Lieberman with the name of WD40+.

Permanent collections and commissions
City of Everett, Everett, WA
City of Seattle, Seattle, WA
Corning Museum of Glass, Corning, NY
, Germany
Pilchuck Glass School, Pilchuck, WA
Museum of Glass, Tacoma, WA
Victoria and Albert Museum, London, England
Chapel, Fred Hutchinson Cancer Research Center, Seattle, WA
Edmonds Woodway High School, Edmonds, WA
General Dynamics Corp., Falls Church, VA (With Sonja Blomdahl)
Kenai Community College, Homer, AK
Kent Senior Citizen’s Center, Kent, WA
Kentwood High School, Kent, WA
M’Connell Foundation, Redding, CA
North Central High School, Spokane, WA
Opera House, Seattle, WA
Port of Shanghai, China
Seattle-Tacoma International Airport, Seattle, WA
Sitka Lutheran Church, Sitka, AK
University of Washington, Seattle, WA

References

External links
 
 Henry Art Gallery - University of Washington - Article on a project of Dick Weiss'

1946 births
Living people
American glass artists
People from Everett, Washington
Yale College alumni